Urnäsch is a municipality in the canton of Appenzell Ausserrhoden, Switzerland.

History

In 831 AD a part of Urnäsch known as Färchen was first mentioned. In the 10th century, Urnäsch was part of the administrative district Herisau. From the 14th century onwards, Urnäsch was part of the Rhode Hundwil, and thus part of the bailiwick of St. Gallen. The first official mentioning of the municipality's entirety as “Urnäschen” occurred in 1344, when the village was sold to the German Earl Werdenberg, although the municipality already had a strong and independent agenda. It became part of the Schwäbischer Städtebund in the same year as the so-called Lendlyn, which further reaffirmed their independent position. In 1401, Urnäsch joined the Bund together with St. Gallen. At that time, Urnäsch was still a part of the Rhode Hundwil. From 1401 to 1429, Urnäsch was on the forefront of the Appenzell wars. After the battles in Vögelinsegg (1403) and Stoss (1405) the land gained independence as part of Appenzell. 

Until 1414, Urnäsch’s population had to go to church in the faraway municipality of Herisau. In the same year, a new church was built in Urnäsch and thereby the municipality obtained its independence in 1417 when the church was inaugurated. In 1480, Hundwil and Urnäsch split. In 1525, Urnäsch joined the reformation. Since the Landteilung in 1597, Urnäsch has been part of Appenzell Ausserrhoden as one of the six outermost Rhoden and was regularly the meeting place of the Kleiner Rat.

In 1641, a large fire broke out in the village and burned down the church, the guildhall, the presbytery, and many other residential buildings. The church was rebuilt shortly thereafter and renovated in the years 1866 to 1888.

Until 1722, the municipality Schönengrund was also part of Urnäsch, but obtained its independence the same year. Since then, the territory of Urnäsch has remained unaltered.

Since the second half of the 19th century, the separation of church and state became more common, until the Swiss constitution of 1908 declared them to be fully separated from each other. Interestingly, the Urnäsch’s constitution only removed the term “Kirchhöri” as its description, which includes both church and government, in the year 2000.

From the 1850’s onwards, tourism began to gain importance as a source of income. In 1853, the municipality’s first bridge was inaugurated, and in1875 a first train stop was built. In the 20th century, especially the establishment of public transport connections were of significance.

Geography

Of this area, 53.9% is used for agricultural purposes, while 41.1% is forested. Of the rest of the land, 3.4% is settled (buildings or roads) and the remainder (1.7%) is non-productive (rivers, glaciers or mountains).

Demographics
Urnäsch has a population of 2,268, of which about 11.6% are foreign nationals. Over the last 10 years the population has decreased at a rate of -3%.  Most of the population speaks German (93.0%), with Serbo-Croatian being second most common ( 2.3%) and Italian being third ( 1.0%).  , the gender distribution of the population was 50.6% male and 49.4% female. The age distribution, in Urnäsch is; 216 people or 9.2% of the population are between 0–6 years old.  316 people or 13.5% are 6-15, and 121 people or 5.2% are 16–19.  Of the adult population, 143 people or 6.1% of the population are between 20–24 years old.  651 people or 27.9% are 25–44, and 495 people or 21.2% are 45–64.  The senior population distribution is 276 people or 11.8% of the population are between 65–79 years old, and 118 people or 5.1% are over 80.

In the 2007 federal election the FDP received 70.6% of the vote.

In Urnäsch about 57.4% of the population (between age 25-64) have completed either non-mandatory upper secondary education or additional higher education (either university or a Fachhochschule).

The historical population is given in the following table:

Weather
Urnäsch has an average of 161.6 days of rain per year and on average receives  of precipitation. During this month there is precipitation for an average of 15.5 days. The month with the most days of precipitation is May, with an average of 15.8, but with only  of precipitation.

Economy
Urnäsch has an unemployment rate of 1.33%.  , there were 215 people employed in the primary economic sector and about 96 businesses involved in this sector.  246 people are employed in the secondary sector and there are 28 businesses in this sector.  496 people are employed in the tertiary sector, with 79 businesses in this sector. There are just under 100 farms and 18 hotels and restaurants in the village.

Transport

Heritage sites of national significance
The Museum für Appenzeller Brauchtum and the Mill House along with the Mill are listed as heritage sites of national significance.

References

External links

 Official Page (German)

Cultural property of national significance in Appenzell Ausserrhoden
Municipalities of Appenzell Ausserrhoden